Karl Prochaska (14 August 1914 – 30 December 1977) was an Austrian speed skater. He competed in the men's 5000 metres event at the 1936 Winter Olympics.

References

1914 births
1977 deaths
Austrian male speed skaters
Olympic speed skaters of Austria
Speed skaters at the 1936 Winter Olympics
Place of birth missing